Wadi al-Arayis is a Palestinian village located ten kilometers east of Bethlehem.The village is in the Bethlehem Governorate Southern West Bank. According to the Palestinian Central Bureau of Statistics, the village had a population of 2,169 in mid-year 2006. The primary healthcare is obtained in al 'Ubeidiya where the Ministry of Heath have classified the care facilities as level 3.

History
In the wake of the 1948 Arab–Israeli War, and after the 1949 Armistice Agreements, Wadi Arayis came under  Jordanian rule.

In a 1961 census the population of Wadi Arayis was 357.

Since the Six-Day War in 1967, the town has been  under Israeli occupation

The population in the 1967 census conducted by the Israeli authorities was 501.

Footnotes

Bibliography

Villages in the West Bank
Bethlehem Governorate
Municipalities of the State of Palestine